Myiopharus punctilucis is a species of tachinid flies in the genus Myiopharus of the family Tachinidae.

Distribution
Peru

External links

Exoristinae
Insects described in 1927
Diptera of South America
Taxa named by Charles Henry Tyler Townsend